The 1983 Plateau State gubernatorial election occurred on August 13, 1983. NPP candidate Solomon Lar won the election.

Results
Solomon Lar representing NPP won the election. The election held on August 13, 1983.

References 

Gubernatorial election 1983
Plateau State gubernatorial election
Plateau State gubernatorial election